The Eparchy of Saskatoon is a Ukrainian Greek Catholic Church ecclesiastical territory or eparchy of the Catholic Church in the Canadian province of Saskatchewan.

The eparchy's cathedral is the Cathedral of St. George in the episcopal see of Saskatoon. The eparchy is a suffragan in the ecclesiastical province of the metropolitan Ukrainian Catholic Archeparchy of Winnipeg.

History 
 Established on March 10, 1951, as Apostolic Exarchate of Saskatoon, on territory split off from the then Apostolic Exarchate of Central Canada.
 November 3, 1956: Elevated to Eparchy of Saskatoon

Bishops

Episcopal ordinaries 
Apostolic Exarch of Saskatoon 
 Andrew Roborecki (1951.03.10 – 1956.11.03 see below), Titular Bishop of Tanais (1948.03.03 – 1956.11.03)

Suffragan Eparchs (Bishops) of Saskatoon
 Andrew Roborecki (see above 1956.11.03 – death 1982.10.24)
 Basil Filevich (1983.12.05 – 1995.11.06)
 Cornelius Pasichny, O.S.B.M. (1995.11.06 – 1998.07.01)
 Michael Wiwchar, C.Ss.R.  (2000.11.29 – 2008.05.02)
 Bryan Bayda, C.Ss.R. (2008.05.02 – 2022.04.28)
 Apostolic Administrator Lawrence Huculak, O.S.B.M. (since 2022.04.28)

Other priest of this eparchy who became bishop
 Kenneth Nowakowski, appointed Bishop of New Westminster (Ukrainian) in 2007

Statistics 
, the eparchy contains 84 parishes, 29 active eparchial and religious priests and 7,256 Catholics. It also has 16 women religious, 9 religious brothers and 3 permanent deacons.

References 

 Eparchy of Saskatoon page at catholichierarchy.org

Sources and external links 
Ukrainian Catholic Eparchy of Saskatoon
 GigaCatholic, with incumbent biography links
Saint George's Cathedral, Saskatoon
Saints Peter & Paul Ukrainian Catholic Church, Saskatoon
Sheptytsky Institute, Saskatoon
St. Mary's Ukrainian Catholic Church, Yorkton
Ukrainian Catholic Redemptorists of the Yorkton Province
Ukrainian Catholic Education Center, Saskatoon
Holy Spirit Seminary, Ottawa

Saskatoon
Ukrainian Catholic Church in Canada
Organizations based in Saskatoon
Saskatoon
Saskatoon, Ukrainian Catholic Eparchy of